Albert Ariel Bedwin "Jack"  Johnson (5 December 1914 – 9 March 1996) was an English real tennis player.

Johnson was real tennis world champion from 1957 through 1959.

Johnson, a native of Moreton Morrell, emigrated from the United Kingdom to the United States, and died in Indiana in 1996.

See also
 Real tennis world champions

References

External links

	

1914 births
1996 deaths
English real tennis players
People from Warwickshire
English emigrants to the United States